Epilobium siskiyouense is a rare species of flowering plant in the evening primrose family known by the common names Siskiyou willowherb and Siskiyou fireweed (though it is not a true fireweed).

Distribution
The plant is endemic to the Klamath Mountains of far northern California and southern Oregon. It grows in mountain habitats, including alpine talus and subalpine coniferous forest, often on serpentine soils.

Description
Epilobium siskiyouense is a small, clumping subshrub growing scaly, often densely hairy and glandular from a woody caudex reaching up to about 25 centimeters in maximum height. The leaves are lance-shaped to oval and under 3 centimeters long.

The glandular inflorescence bears bright to deep pink flowers with petals 1 or 2 centimeters long. The fruit is a hairy capsule reaching up to 4.5 centimeters in length.

External links

Jepson Manual Treatment for Epilobium siskiyouense
Epilobium siskiyouense — U.C. Photo gallery

siskiyouense
Flora of California
Flora of Oregon
Flora of the Klamath Mountains
Endemic flora of the United States
Rogue River-Siskiyou National Forest
Flora without expected TNC conservation status